Mikhail Sergeyevich Kozlov (born 2 November 1986) is a Russian former professional footballer.

Club career
He made his debut in the Russian Premier League in 2005 for FC Zenit St. Petersburg and played one game for them in the UEFA Cup 2005–06.

References

1986 births
Footballers from Saint Petersburg
Living people
Russian footballers
Russia youth international footballers
Association football midfielders
FC Zenit Saint Petersburg players
FC Rostov players
FC Ural Yekaterinburg players
Russian Premier League players
FC Petrotrest players
FC Vityaz Podolsk players
FC Sokol Saratov players
FC Luch Vladivostok players
FC Dynamo Saint Petersburg players
FC Tekstilshchik Ivanovo players
FC Zenit-2 Saint Petersburg players